Caramelized pork and eggs is a Cambodian and Vietnamese dish traditionally consisting of small pieces of marinated pork and boiled eggs braised in coconut juice.

Although it is a familiar part of an everyday meal amongst the Khmer Krom and Vietnamese in Southern Vietnam, it is also one of the traditional dishes during Vietnamese New Year. Before it is served for general consumption, the food is offered to deceased ancestors or family members on altars. 

In Vietnam, rice is commonly served alongside this dish. It is similar to tau yu bak (豆油肉), a traditional Hokkien dish.

See also
 Tết

References

Cambodian cuisine
Vietnamese cuisine
Egg dishes